The 2017 IIHF U18 World Championship was the 19th IIHF World U18 Championship and was hosted by Poprad and Spišská Nová Ves, Slovakia. The tournament was played from 13 to 23 April 2017. Finland entered the tournament as the defending champions and once again advanced to the final, but this time they lost to the United States.

Top Division
All times are local. (Central European Summer Time – UTC+02:00)

Preliminary round
The four best ranked teams from each group of the preliminary round advance to the quarterfinals, while the last placed team from both groups plays a relegation round in a best of three format to determine the relegated team.

Group A

Group B

Relegation round

Playoff round

Quarterfinals

Semifinals

Bronze medal game

Final

Scoring leaders

List shows the top ten skaters sorted by points, then goals.

 GP = Games played; G = Goals; A = Assists; Pts = Points; +/− = Plus-minus; PIM = Penalties In MinutesSource: IIHF.com

Leading goaltenders

Only the top five goaltenders, based on save percentage, who have played 40% of their team's minutes are included in this list.

 TOI = Time On Ice (minutes:seconds); SA = Shots against; GA = Goals against; GAA = Goals against average; Sv% = Save percentage; SO = ShutoutsSource: IIHF.com

Tournament awards

Most Valuable Player
 Forward:  Kristian Vesalainen

All-star team
 Goaltender:  Dylan St. Cyr
 Defencemen:  Miro Heiskanen,  Max Gildon
 Forwards:  Kristian Vesalainen,  Sean Dhooghe,  Ivan Chekhovich
Source: IIHF.com 

IIHF best player awards
 Goaltender:  Maxim Zhukov
 Defenceman:  Miro Heiskanen
 Forward:  Kristian Vesalainen
Source: IIHF.com

Final standings

Division I

Division I A
The Division I A tournament was played in Bled, Slovenia, from 7 to 13 April 2017.

Division I B

The Division I B tournament will be played in Bled, Slovenia, from 15 to 21 April 2017.

Division II

Division II A
The Division II A tournament was played in Gangneung, South Korea, from 2 to 8 April 2017.

Division II B

The Division II B tournament was played in Belgrade, Serbia, from 13 to 19 March 2017.  Australia achieved the unusual distinction of being promoted in consecutive years.

Division III

Division III A

The Division III A tournament was played in Taipei, Taiwan, from 21 to 27 March 2017.

Division III B

The Division III B tournament was played in Mexico City, Mexico, from 17 to 19 March 2017.

References

External links
Website
IIHF.com

 
IIHF World U18 Championships
IIHF World U18 Championships
2017
2016–17 in Slovak ice hockey
IIHF World U18 Championships
Sport in Poprad
Spišská Nová Ves